YES Prep Public Schools, Inc. is a network of public, open-enrollment charter schools located in Greater Houston. Its headquarters are located at its Southside campus. The YES program is a university-preparatory program for grades K-12.

History
YES Prep (Youth Engaged in Service) began in 1995 as Project YES. The program was founded at Rusk Elementary School in the Houston Independent School District by Chris Barbic. Since 1998, YES Prep has been operating under a state charter.

Previously, the headquarters were in the Greater Sharpstown Management District.

District Partnerships

SKY Partnership 
In 2011, YES Prep partnered with KIPP-Houston Public Schools and Spring Branch ISD, becoming the SKY Partnership. YES Prep Northbrook Middle School began in the 2012-2013 school year with only 6th graders. They added 7th graders in the 2013-2014 school year and added 8th graders in the 2014-2015 school year. It's co-located with Spring Branch ISD's Northbrook Middle School, which also has 6th through 8th graders. Along with KIPP-Courage, which has 5th through 8th graders, YES Prep Northbrook Middle School feeds into YES Prep Northbrook High School, located within Spring Branch's Northbrook High School, which has 9-12th graders. YES Prep Northbrook High School opened in the  2015-2016 school year with only 9th graders. They added 10th graders in the 2016-2017 school year, added 11th graders in the  2017-2018 school year, and added 12th graders in the 2018-2019 school year. KIPP Courage College Prep opened in the 2012-2013 school year with only 5th graders. They added 6th graders in the 2013-2014 school year, added 7th graders in the 2014-2015 school year, and added 8th graders in the 2015-2016 school year. KIPP Courage is located within Spring Branch ISD's Landrum Middle School, which has 6-8th graders .

Aldine and YES Prep Partnership 
In 2013, YES Prep partnered with Aldine ISD. YES Prep Hoffman opened in the 2013-2014 school year with 6th graders. It's located within Aldine ISD's Hoffman Middle School, which has 7th and 8th graders. YES Prep Hoffman students feed into YES Prep Eisenhower, which is located within Aldine's Eisenhower High School, which has 10th through 12th graders. YES Prep Hoffman added 7th graders in the 2014-2015 school year and added 8th graders in the 2015-2016 school year. YES Prep Eisenhower opened in the 2016-2017 school year with only 9th graders. They added 10th graders in the  2017-2018 school year, added 11th graders in the 2018-2019 school year, and added 12th graders in the 2019-2020 school year.

Schools 
As of the 2022-2023 school year, YES Prep operates twenty-three schools in Houston:
Bray Oaks, home of the Cavaliers (2009;6-12th)
East End, home of the Explorers (2006; 6-12th)
Eisenhower, home of the Eagles (2016; 9-12th)
Fifth Ward, home of the Titans (2011;6-12th)
Gulfton, home of the Force (2007;6-12th)
Hobby, home of the Aviators (2019;6-8th)
Hoffman, home of the Hornets (2013;6-8th)
North Central Secondary, home of the Trailblazers (2003;6-12th)
North Central Elementary (2020;K-3)
North Forest, home of the Legends (2010;6-12th)
North Forest Elementary (2021;K-3)
Northbrook Middle, home of the Knights (2012;6-8th)
Northbrook High, home of the Raiders (2015;9-12th)
Northline, home of the Revolutionaries (2017;6-10th)
Northside, home of the Pride (2011;6-12th)
Northwest, home of the Hawks (2018;6-9th)
Southeast Secondary, home of the Wizards (1998;6-12th)
Southeast Elementary (2020;K-3)
Southside, home of the Giants (2015;6-12th)
Southside Elementary (2021;K-2)
Southwest, home of the Mavericks (2004;6-12th)
West, home of the Marvels (2009;6-12th)
White Oak, home of the Owls (2013;6-12th)

Recognition
As of 2017, all of YES Prep's eligible high schools earned a gold ranking by U.S. News & World Report. Two campuses are ranked in the top 100 in the nation and four are in Texas's top 20.

Seven of YES Prep's high schools were named among the nation's most challenging high schools by The Washington Post.

In 2010, Oprah Winfrey donated 1 million dollars each to six charter school systems, including YES Prep.

In 2013, Senator Ted Cruz gave up his salary during the government shutdown by donating $7,627.40, "equal to 16 days of gross pay," to YES Prep, which "he and Heidi support."

Athletics

Records

 In 2014, YES Prep Southeast participated in the Texas Charter School Academic & Athletic League and won the state championship for boys' cross country team competition while the girls' team also placed second.

See also

 Teach for America
 List of state-chartered charter schools in Houston

References 

Public education in Houston
High schools in Harris County, Texas
Charter schools in Texas